The Interstate Rugby League Series refers to Australian Rugby league matches played between the New South Wales rugby league team, colloquially known as the 'Blues', and the Queensland rugby league team, known as the 'Maroons', between 1908 and 1981. The Interstate Series concept was based upon the state of residency of the player, however, due to NSW dominance from 1962–1981 winning 20 straight Interstate titles, the State of Origin concept was initiated in 1980, and after two exhibition matches, succeeded the Interstate Series in 1982.

History 
Since the beginning of Australian rugby league in 1908, an interstate competition between New South Wales and Queensland has been conducted from almost annually (not in WWI, Spanish Flu and WWII). Until 1982 each team drew its players from the clubs based in that state. No consideration was given to the origins of the players themselves.

The first of these interstate games was played at Sydney's Agricultural Ground on 11 July 1908, before Queensland had even commenced its club competition. New South Wales easily accounted for Queensland in a 43–0 victory. The local media were unimpressed.

 There can be no doubt the NSW men are improving a good deal... They cannot be blamed for the farce, for it was nothing else. If the Australian team depends on Queenslanders to strengthen it, one is afraid it will be found wanting. They are quite the weakest lot of footballers I have even seen come down from Queensland. The play needs no detailed description as it was simply a practice match for NSW, and certainly did not advantageously advertise the new game.
 –The Sydney Morning Herald, 13 July 1908

The interstate series was dominated by New South Wales, apart from a golden period for Queensland in the 1920s. From 1922 to 1925 Queensland defeated New South Wales 11 times in 12 matches. At the end of the 1925 season, a Kangaroo team was to be picked for touring Great Britain. Instead of announcing an Australian team dominated by Queenslanders, the Australian Rugby League Board of Control informed the media that the Rugby Football League had decided that the Kiwis would provide stronger opposition and that there would be no Australian tour. The period spanning 1922 to 1929 saw no Australian team play in Great Britain, the only such hiatus outside the two World Wars.

The New South Wales dominance of interstate football increased after 1956 when gaming machines were legalised for all registered clubs in New South Wales. This provided New South Wales football clubs with a revenue source unmatched by Queensland clubs. From this time on an increasing number of Queensland players moved to the much stronger Sydney competition, becoming ineligible for Queensland state selection. Paul Hogan famously told a Queensland Rugby League gathering in 1977 that "every time Queensland produces a good footballer, he finishes up being processed through a New South Wales poker machine."

Before 1956, NSW had won 75% and Qld only 25% of series played. From 1956 to 1981, NSW dominance soared even higher and Qld wins dwindled to only 3.8% with only 1 series win, in 1959.

Interstate Series Results (1908-1981) 
During the Interstate Series era, there were 66 series played, with New South Wales winning 50, Queensland winning 10, and 6 being draws. However on each of the 6 occasions there was a drawn series, the previous year's winner retained the title, with 4 being retained by NSW and 2 by QLD, meaning NSW won 54 titles and QLD 12 titles during the Interstate Series era.

Notable runs of consecutive titles were NSW, 20 in a row (1962-81), NSW 9 in a row in intermittent early years (1908, 1910-13, 1915, 1919-21), NSW 7 in a row around WWII (1941, 1945-50) and again in the 1950s (1952-58), NSW 6 in a row (1933-39), QLD 5 in a row (1922-26), and QLD 3 in a row (1959-61). The 1973 series was also notable for New South Wales' complete shutout of Queensland in the series, with margins of 16-0, 10-0 and 26-0 across the three games for a series margin of 52-0.

Due to many factors, anywhere between one and five games were played in a series over the course of the competition. 

Source:

State of Origin (1980-present)

Conception of State of Origin football 
By the 1970s the prestige of interstate matches had been seriously downgraded, in most part due to the fact that a number of Queensland players signed to NSW clubs could not unseat the NSW incumbent and also were not eligible for Queensland selection, so they did not play at all. Matches were played mid-week, so as not to interfere with the Sydney club competition, and the small crowds in New South Wales were hosted at suburban grounds. Interstate football reached its nadir in 1977 when the New South Wales Rugby Football League (NSWRFL) declined to host the Queensland team, and both interstate games were played in Queensland.

Former Queensland captain and Australian vice-captain Jack Reardon, who had later become a journalist, was the first to suggest that Sydney-based Queenslanders should be available for selection to represent their state.

Brisbane Courier-Mail reporter Hugh Lunn, Barry Maranta (the future co-founder of the Brisbane Broncos)  and Maranta's business partner Wayne Reid played a part in persuading QRL chairman Ron McAullife that the concept could be used in rugby league. Lunn told McAullife that "you can take the Queenslander out of Queensland, Ron, but you can't take the Queensland out of the Queenslander." McAuliffe was initially skeptical. "What if we recall our boys from Sydney to play, and we are beaten. Where would we go from there?" Reid spoke to NSWRFL president Kevin Humphreys and suggested that a one-off state of origin match could be used as a Test Match selection trial. 

New South Wales clubs were reticent in their support of the concept and set two conditions:

 If the third game was to decide the series it was not to act as a selection trial, and also,
 that the expatriate Queenslanders would be under the supervision of a representative of the NSWRFL whose duty it would be to protect the interests of both the NSWRFL and the clubs to which they were contracted. (From 1980 this role was filled by Bob Abbott, a Cronulla-Sutherland Sharks official.)

Three Sydney clubs remained opposed to the plan: St. George Dragons, South Sydney Rabbitohs and Eastern Suburbs Roosters. As these clubs were refusing to release players, Humphreys threatened to make the game an official Australian Rugby League trial, which would make release mandatory. The clubs backed down.

Results

Overall Results 
Including the Interstate Series and State of Origin results, NSW has won 70 titles, and Queensland has won 37 titles. The all time record of games played is 347 with New South Wales having 216 wins, Queensland 121 wins, and 10 matches have been drawn.

Asterisk (*): includes 1980, 1981 and 1987 exhibition game results in Win-Loss-Draw columns even though they were not part of any series

References 

Rugby league competitions in Australia 
State of Origin 
Defunct rugby league competitions in Australia 
Rugby league rivalries
Rugby league in Queensland
Rugby league in New South Wales
1908 establishments in Australia
Sports leagues established in 1908
Sports rivalries in Australia